Ernesto Bono (born 25 April 1936) is an Italian racing cyclist. He finished in ninth place in the 1959 Giro d'Italia.

References

External links
 

1936 births
Living people
Italian male cyclists
Place of birth missing (living people)
Cyclists from the Province of Brescia
Tour de Suisse stage winners